The Town of Wyoming is a town located in Iowa County, Wisconsin, United States. The population was 364 at the 2000 census.

Landmarks
Frank Lloyd Wright's Taliesin is located in the town, as is his Wyoming Valley School. Unity Chapel, designed by Joseph Lyman Silsbee and worked on by Wright, is also located in Wyoming.

Geography
According to the United States Census Bureau, the town has a total area of 40.8 square miles (105.8 km2), of which, 39.8 square miles (103.0 km2) of it is land and 1.1 square miles (2.8 km2) of it (2.64%) is water.

Demographics
As of the census of 2000, there were 364 people, 145 households, and 107 families residing in the town. The population density was 9.2 people per square mile (3.5/km2). There were 212 housing units at an average density of 5.3 per square mile (2.1/km2). The racial makeup of the town was 99.18% White, 0.27% Native American, 0.27% from other races, and 0.27% from two or more races. Hispanic or Latino of any race were 0.27% of the population.

There were 145 households, out of which 29.0% had children under the age of 18 living with them, 66.9% were married couples living together, 4.1% had a female householder with no husband present, and 26.2% were non-families. 19.3% of all households were made up of individuals, and 4.1% had someone living alone who was 65 years of age or older. The average household size was 2.47 and the average family size was 2.81.

In the town, the population was spread out, with 24.2% under the age of 18, 3.3% from 18 to 24, 31.6% from 25 to 44, 28.8% from 45 to 64, and 12.1% who were 65 years of age or older. The median age was 42 years. For every 100 females, there were 106.8 males. For every 100 females age 18 and over, there were 112.3 males.

The median income for a household in the town was $48,438, and the median income for a family was $56,607. Males had a median income of $33,393 versus $40,673 for females. The per capita income for the town was $23,253. About 6.9% of families and 9.7% of the population were below the poverty line, including 18.8% of those under age 18 and 20.8% of those age 65 or over.

Notable people
 Robert Joiner, farmer and politician
 Owen King, businessman and politician
 Albert Richardson, farmer and politician
 Harold D. Richardson, educator

See also
 List of towns in Wisconsin

References

External links

 

Towns in Iowa County, Wisconsin
Madison, Wisconsin, metropolitan statistical area
Towns in Wisconsin